Kolkata Knight Riders (KKR) is a franchise cricket team based in Kolkata, India, which plays in the Indian Premier League (IPL). They were one of the eight teams that competed in the 2015 Indian Premier League. They were captained by Gautam Gambhir. Kolkata Knight Riders finished 5th in the IPL and did not qualify for the Champions League T20.

Indian Premier League

Season standings
Kolkata Knight Riders finished 5th in the league stage of IPL 2015.

Match log

References

Kolkata Knight Riders seasons
2015 Indian Premier League